O. occidentalis  may refer to:
 Onychorhynchus occidentalis, the Pacific royal flycatcher, a bird species found in Ecuador and Peru
 Osmorhiza occidentalis, the western sweetroot, a flowering plant species native to much of western North America

See also
 List of Latin and Greek words commonly used in systematic names#O